Czersk is a Polish State Railways (PKP) station in Czersk (Pomeranian Voivodeship), Poland.

Lines crossing the station

Train services
The station is served by the following service(s):
Intercity services (TLK) Gdynia Główna — Kostrzyn 
Regional services (R) Chojnice - Czarna Woda - Starogard Gdanski - Tczew
Regional services (R) Chojnice — Tczew — Gdynia Główna

References 

Czersk article at Polish Stations Database, URL accessed at 7 March 2006

Railway stations in Pomeranian Voivodeship
Chojnice County